Matthias Peßolat (born 26 March 1985) is a German footballer who currently plays as a defensive midfielder for Wacker Nordhausen.

References

External links
 
 Profile at Soccerway

1985 births
Living people
Association football midfielders
German footballers
Footballers from Brandenburg
FC Energie Cottbus II players
FC Rot-Weiß Erfurt players
Chemnitzer FC players
FC Carl Zeiss Jena players
Sportspeople from Cottbus
3. Liga players
Regionalliga players